John Haeny is an American-born music producer, recording and mixing engineer, sound designer and academic. From the late 1960s through the late 1980s he recorded, mixed and produced hundreds of albums. He worked with a variety of artists across multiple genres including Bonnie Raitt, Jackson Browne, Jim Morrison, Tom Jones, Warren Zevon and Linda Ronstadt to Weather Report, John Coltrane, Freddie Hubbard and Duke Ellington.

Throughout his career he has produced, engineered and mixed various Gold and Platinum certified albums from the 1960s onwards.

Following his work in the music industry, Haeny spent nearly two decades working in film and television as a sound designer. During this period he was part of 5 separate sound departments to receive Primetime Emmy Nominations.

Early life and education
During his teenage years, Haeny became a photographer while studying at high school. Following high school Haeny attended the Brooks Institute of Photography, in Santa Barbara, California, where he graduated with a degree in portraiture.

Music career

Early career in the 1960s
Following his education, Haeny spent two decades working as a recording engineer and producer. During this period he mainly worked in the music industry in the United States.

In 1963, Haeny relocated to San Francisco where he worked with most of the early San Francisco bands including many signed to the Tempo/Autumn Record Label. A year later, Haeny and John Coltrane worked on 4 unreleased tracks.

After his relocation to Los Angeles, Haeny was responsible for working on production for the single, "I'm a Believer" along with Jeff Barry. The hit from the band The Monkees became a well-known track, which went Gold within two days of its release following over 1 million advance orders. It was the last No. 1 hit of 1966 and the biggest selling record in 1967 as the single spent 7 weeks at number one in total. It is one of the fewer than forty all-time singles to have sold 10 million (or more) physical copies worldwide.

In 1967, Haeny began working with Judy Collins. Her sixth album Wildflowers was engineered by Haeny, with Mark Abramson on production. The album was her highest finishing chart album, reaching 5th position on the Billboard Pop Album Charts. The album featured the hit version of Joni Mitchell's "Both Sides Now", for which Judy was to win the 1968 Grammy Award for the Best Folk Performance. Haeny was also responsible for the recording and mixing Collins' seventh album, Who Knows Where the Time Goes. He also Engineered, Mixed & was Assistant Producer for her eighth album, which was released in 1970 and titled Whales & Nightingales. All three Collins albums recorded by Haeny were certified Gold by the RIAA for the number of sales they achieved. The Whales & Nightingales album also contained the successful recording of the song, "Amazing Grace".

Haeny first worked with The Doors in 1968 on their album Waiting for the Sun. It became the band's first and only number one album in the United States. In 1968, Haeny was the ‘anonymous’ mixer for David Crosby's production of Joni Mitchell's first studio album, Song to a Seagull.

Producing in the 1970s
Haeny was the major contributing sound engineer for the Judy Collins Greatest Hits album, Colors of the Day. The album was released in 1972 and peaked at no. 37 on the Billboard Charts. During 1973, Haeny was the recording engineer for the album Full Moon. The album is a duet album by Kris Kristofferson and Rita Coolidge, the first of three duet albums by them. It was released in 1973 on A&M Records. "From the Bottle to the Bottom" won the 1973 Grammy Award for Best Country Vocal Performance by a Duo or Group. The couple married the year before the album's release. The album The Body and Soul was released by Tom Jones during the same year and was recorded and engineered by Haeny. The album was only released in the UK and wasn't released worldwide.

Linda Ronstadt and Haeny first worked together on her fourth studio album in 1973, titled Don't Cry Now. Haeny was the principal recording engineer on the album, which went Gold. Heart Like a Wheel was released in 1974 by Linda Ronstadt. The Grammy Award-winning fifth solo album was the last of her studio albums for Capitol Records. The album was seen by some as a pioneering album for the country rock genre. The album, on which Haeny was a contributing engineer, spent 51 weeks on the album chart.

Little Feat's album Dixie Chicken was first released in 1973. Haeny mixed a large portion of Dixie Chicken. The third studio album was considered a landmark album with the title track as their signature song that helped further define the Little Feat sound. A year later in 1974, Haeny also worked on the engineering of Little Feat's fourth studio album, Feats Don't Fail Me Now.

Haeny worked on the live recording for Jackson Browne's best selling album, For Everyman. Browne's For Everyman album was released in 1973, which was his second studio album. Following its release, it was listed in Rolling Stone magazine's list of The 500 Greatest Albums of All Time in 457th position. Haeny also did the live recording on Browne's fourth studio album, The Pretender. It went Platinum twice and was also part of the list of The 500 Greatest Albums of All Time by Rolling Stone in 391st position.

Linda Ronstadt's first major compilation album, released at the end of 1976 and was titled, Greatest Hits. The songs on the album dated back to 1967, and also included songs from the two albums Haeny engineered, Don't Cry Now and Heart Like a Wheel. It remains the biggest-selling album of Ronstadt's entire career, being certified seven times Platinum (over 7 million US copies sold) by the Recording Industry Association of America in America alone and has sold nearly 20 million worldwide as of 2014. She later released a second volume of her Greatest Hits, titled Greatest Hits, Volume 2. The compilation album was released in 1980 and also contained work by Haeny as an engineer.

During the same year, Haeny was responsible for recording and mixing, Warren Zevon's second album, which was self-titled. One of Haeny's most notable achievements came in 1978 when he was responsible for producing and engineering of An American Prayer. The release came seven years after lead singer Jim Morrison died and five years after the remaining members of the band The Doors broke up, Ray Manzarek, Robby Krieger and John Densmore reunited and recorded backing tracks for Morrison's poetry, which was originally recorded in 1969 and 1970 by Haeny. The album went platinum shortly after its release. Haeny was co-producing Jim Morrison's poetry album in the early 1970s before his sudden passing at the age of 27. Much of that work was used on the album, An American Prayer. It also contained the recording of "Roadhouse Blues", which has been called "probably one of the best live performances of any song".

1980s onwards and recent career
After the release of the album An American Prayer a number of compilation albums were released by The Doors. Haeny had featured contributions on many of them. The first came in 1980, when they released a best of album titled Greatest Hits. They followed up 5 years later with The Best of The Doors, which went Diamond in 2007. In 1991 the soundtrack to Oliver Stone's film The Doors was released. The film soundtrack achieved Platinum in the US, which contained a number of tracks directly pulled from the album An American Prayer. Following the release of the film, also came the release of a live compilation album from The Doors. The live album was titled In Concert and was released in June 1991.

Film career
Following his work in the music industry, Haeny moved to television and film, where he specialized as a sound designer and sound editor. From 1986 onwards, Haeny featured regularly in film and US Network television as an engineer and sound editor. His first role was as a sound editor for the TV Series Dallas in 1986. Following this first role, he worked in sound departments throughout Hollywood for nearly two decades. His first major achievement came in 1987, when Haeny and his sound department were nominated for a Primetime Emmy Award for his work on Fresno. Over the next couple of decades, his credits included, Scent of a Woman, Twin Peaks, While You Were Sleeping, Robin Hood: Prince of Thieves, Dallas and Beauty and the Beast, among others. His body of work has garnered six Golden Reel nominations and five Primetime Emmy Award nominations.

Sound production
Haeny continues to work in the music industry with his own studio, Sunny Hill Studios, which is located where he resides in Tasmania, Australia. It is also home to his 5.1 Pro Tools mixing facility. Here Haeny is also a beta tester for Waves Audio and also the co-developer of the Kramer Master Tape plugin.

Notable productions

Album production

Emmy Nominations

|-
| 1987
| Fresno as Sound Editor
| Outstanding Sound Editing for a Miniseries or a Special
| 
|-
| 1990
| Twin Peaks as Sound Editor
| Outstanding Sound Editing for a Series
| 
|-
| 1991
| Separate but Equal as Sound Editor
| Outstanding Sound Editing for a Miniseries or a Special
| 
|-
| 1992
| Wedlock as Sound Editor
| Outstanding Individual Achievement in Sound Editing for a Miniseries or a Special
| 
|-
| 1995
| Earth 2 (TV series) as Sound Editor
| Outstanding Sound Editing for a Series
| 
|}

Further reading
 The making of An American Prayer

References

External links 

 Official website
 John Haeny at Discogs

1941 births
Living people
Musicians from Omaha, Nebraska
American audio engineers
Brooks Institute alumni